Andrushivka Astronomical Observatory is a private astronomical observatory in the town suburbs of Andrushivka, Zhytomyr Oblast, Ukraine. It was established in 2001. The founder and director of the observatory is Yuri Ivashchenko. The observatory has IAU observatory code A50.

On September 18, 2003 the observatory discovered a main-belt asteroid, which was later named after the town, 133293 Andrushivka. On October 17, 2007, 175636 Zvyagel was discovered at the observatory. It was named Zvyagel as it was the 750th anniversary of the city. On August 25, 2008 another main belt asteroid was discovered which was named 274301 Wikipedia after the encyclopedia in January 2013.

Instruments
The main instrument is a 60 cm Zeiss-600 Cassegrain reflector made by Carl Zeiss Jena.

List of discovered minor planets 

More than a hundred minor planets were discovered at the Andrushivka Astronomical Observatory, not counting yet unnumbered bodies such as the near-Earth object of the Apollo group, for which the observatory will be likely  credited with its discovery by the Minor Planet Center.

See also 
 List of asteroid-discovering observatories

References

External links 
 Web Sites of Astrometrica Users, at www.astrometrica.at

Andrushivka
Astronomical observatories in Ukraine
Buildings and structures in Zhytomyr Oblast
Buildings and structures completed in 2001

Minor-planet discovering observatories